The 738th Radar Squadron is an inactive United States Air Force unit. It was last assigned to the 30th Air Division, Aerospace Defense Command, stationed at Olathe Air Force Station, Kansas. It was deactivated on 8 September 1968.

The unit was a General Surveillance Radar squadron providing for the air defense of the United States. The Federal Aviation Administration was co-located inside the 
Boundary of the 738th. The FAA maintained and operated the search radar system (AN/FPS-27) to control air traffic for western Missouri, and eastern Kansas. The 738th 
maintained two AN/FPS-6 radar systems. 

Lineage
 Activated as 738th Aircraft Control and Warning Squadron on 1 February 1953
 Redesignated as 738th Radar Squadron (SAGE), 1 January 1962
 Inactivated on 8 September 1988

Assignments
 33d Air Division, 1 February 1953
 20th Air Division, 1 March 1956
 Kansas City Air Defense Sector, 1 January 1960
 Sioux City Air Defense Sector, 1 July 1961
 30th Air Division, 1 April 1966 – 8 September 1988

Stations
 Olathe AFS, Kansas, 1 February 1953 – 8 September 1988

References

  Lloyd H. Cornett and Mildred W. Johnson, A Handbook of Aerospace Defense Organization 1946-1980, Office of History, Aerospace Defense Center, Peterson Air Force Base, Colorado (1980)
 Winkler, David F. (1997), Searching the skies: the legacy of the United States Cold War defense radar program. Prepared for United States Air Force Headquarters Air Combat Command.

External links

Radar squadrons of the United States Air Force
Aerospace Defense Command units